The cantons of Marseille are administrative divisions of the Bouches-du-Rhône department, in southeastern France. Since the French canton reorganisation which came into effect in March 2015, the city of Marseille is subdivided into 12 cantons. Their seat is in Marseille.

Cantons

References

 
Cantons of Bouches-du-Rhône